Ali Reghba (born 14 January 2000) is a professional footballer who plays as a striker for CR Belouizdad. Born in Germany, he has played youth football for the Republic of Ireland national team. Besides the Republic of Ireland, he has played in Algeria and England.

Career

Club career

Reghba started his career with Bohemians.
In 2019, Reghba signed for the reserves of English Premier League side Leicester City. Before the second half of 2021–22, Reghba signed for CR Belouizdad in Algeria. On 7 March 2022, he debuted for CR Belouizdad during a 2–0 win over PAC.

International career

Reghba is also eligible to represent Germany through birth, and Algeria through his father.

References

External links
 

2000 births
Algerian Ligue Professionnelle 1 players
Association football forwards
Bohemian F.C. players
CR Belouizdad players
Expatriate footballers in Algeria
Expatriate footballers in England
Irish expatriate sportspeople in England
Irish people of Algerian descent
League of Ireland players
Living people
Republic of Ireland association footballers
Republic of Ireland expatriate association footballers
Republic of Ireland youth international footballers
Footballers from Essen
German people of Algerian descent